Iris, The Happy Professor (also known as Iris and Professor Iris and in French as Iris, le gentil professeur or Professeur Iris) is a Canadian-produced television show that run for 156 episodes from 1992 to 1994, created by former Belgian-born comic book artist Henri Desclez and revolving around Professor Iris, a purple ibis who teaches a class of three students: Piano, Skeleton, and Plant. The Professor teaches a variety of subjects to his students and always wears a bowtie based on the topic of the lesson in each episode.

A French-language version was made by Montreal's Cinélume Film et Vidéo (under the supervision of Vincent Davy for the first two seasons, uncredited on the first and credited on the second; then Christine Boivineau for the remaining episodes, with Joey Galimi for song adaptation).

Characters
 Professor Iris: played by Pier Paquette (English); Pierre Auger (French) – A purple ibis and teacher at the unnamed school that serves as the series' setting. He is knowledgeable, optimistic, and the series' protagonist.
 Skeleton: played by Frank Meschkuleit, Rob Mills (English); Jean Galtier (French) – A skeleton of an ibis with bones laid over a red cardigan.
 Piano: played by Tim Gosley (English); Élise Bertrand (French) – A pink piano who loves music.
 Plant: played by Tim Gosley (English); Gilbert Lachance (French) – A whimsical flower in a flowerpot.
 Ms. Principal: played by Frank Meschkuleit, Rob Mills (English); Daniel Picard (French) – A yellow duck who is headmistress of the school. She often walks into the class to complain about the racket when it gets noisy.
 Mr. Plumeau: played by Michel Lapointe (English); Edgar Fruitier (French) – A grey dog who serves as the school's janitor.
 Kiwi: played by Jani Lauzon (English); Lisette Dufour (French) – A green frog who is Ms. Principal's niece.

International broadcasting
Iris, The Happy Professor has aired in several countries and territories including Canada, France, the United States, Israel, Hong Kong, the United Kingdom, Latin America, Malaysia, Philippines, Singapore, Spain, Scotland, Brunei and Jordan.

External links
 Iris The Happy Professor Super Website on archive.org
 
 Information about the show on UNIS TV
 Information about the French dub
 French information on Planète Jeunesse

1992 Canadian television series debuts
1994 Canadian television series endings
Canadian television shows featuring puppetry
1990s Canadian children's television series
Treehouse TV original programming
Television shows filmed in Montreal
Television series about birds
Television series about educators
English-language television shows